Derek Gebhard (born October 15, 1995) is an American soccer player who currently plays for Forward Madison FC in USL League One.

Career
Gebhard played one year of college soccer at Florida Gulf Coast University in 2014.

Gebhard played with NPSL side Jacksonville United FC in 2015, before moving to their parent club Jacksonville Armada of the North American Soccer League on July 30, 2015.

In 2019, Gebhard was traded to OKC Energy, with Alexy Bosetti going the other way.

In February 2021, Forward Madison FC, the USL League One club in Madison, Wisconsin, announced that it had signed Gebhard as a winger.

References

External links
 Armada bio

1995 births
Living people
American soccer players
Association football forwards
Charlotte Independence players
El Paso Locomotive FC players
Forward Madison FC players
Florida Gulf Coast Eagles men's soccer players
Jacksonville Armada FC players
National Premier Soccer League players
North American Soccer League players
OKC Energy FC players
People from Severna Park, Maryland
Soccer players from Maryland
Sportspeople from Anne Arundel County, Maryland